Grantham College is a further education and Sixth Form college in Grantham, Lincolnshire, England.

History

Construction
Air Chief Marshal Arthur Longmore lived at Elsham House from about 1920; his daughter Janet was mother of Tony Worth, whose father Sqn Ldr George Worth MBE stood as the Conservative candidate in the 1945 Grantham election. Elsham House was sold by auction on Wednesday 17 October 1945 for £5,334 to Grantham Technical College, and it was hoped to open the college by September 1947, but it would be open by at least 1948. The house, and squash court, were converted to classrooms in 1948 for £8,500. In 1949 £33,000 was spent on new workshops for engineering and gas fitting and classrooms.

Main building began in 1952, and it became Grantham College for Further Education. The building was officially opened on Tuesday 8 September 1959 by the conservationist Sir Peter Scott. Building had cost £252,031 and equipment had cost £52,377.

Education across Grantham
In the early 1970s there were advanced proposals by Kesteven County Council (based in Sleaford) to abolish the eleven-plus selection system in the Grantham area and use Grantham College as the only sixth form in the town. Mary Large, the Chairman of the Kesteven Education Committee, said that more young people preferred to go to college rather than stay in a school sixth form because of the 'more adult atmosphere'. In 1973 the Education Secretary, Margaret Thatcher, had to approve the plan, which involved converting her former school, Kesteven and Grantham Girls' School, into a mixed comprehensive. It was not approved.

In April 1974 control of the college passed from Kesteven to Lincolnshire County Council in Lincoln. Later, in 1979, it became Grantham College of Further Education. In the early 1990s control passed to the Further Education Funding Council for England, then to the East Midlands Learning and Skills Council based at Leicester. Also in the early 1990s the college name was shortened to Grantham College, and became an Associate College of Nottingham Trent University. It is now an Associate College of  the University of Bedfordshire, and Bishop Grosseteste University College, and through these it offers HND, HNC, and Foundation degree courses.

The college was never officially a fully developed sixth form college, although used for that purpose; in 2008 a purpose-built sixth form college opened in Grantham at the Walton Girls High School.

From September 2010 the College provided for equestrian courses at The Paddocks Equestrian Centre at Hough-on-the-Hill, a village to the north of Grantham.

Structure
Grantham College's Elsham House building was built by Richard Hornsby & Sons in the 1860s. The college has 77 residential places in Sedgwick Hall and Sedgwick Mews halls of residence. A satellite to Grantham College is Sleaford College, in the nearby town of Sleaford.

Grantham College is accessed via the A1 and East Coast Main Line, and the A52 from the east. However, most college usage is by those who live in close proximity. The other nearby Lincolnshire towns of Spalding and Bourne do not have FE colleges.

Notable alumni
 Beverley Allitt - Serial killer nurse.
 W. Alec Osborn MBE – president from 2006-7 of the Institution of Mechanical Engineers, and former Chief Engineer of Perkins Engines
 Abi Titmuss, acquired a Grade D in Science in society AS-level, in August 1995

See also
 New College Stamford - the other FE college in South Kesteven

References

External links
 Grantham College – Official website
 "Grantham College in Sleaford", Grantham College. Retrieved 8 July 2013  
 "Grantham College", EduBase2. Retrieved 8 July 2013

Further education colleges in Lincolnshire
Educational institutions established in 1948
Buildings and structures in Grantham
1948 establishments in England
Education in Grantham